The Kingdom of Jaén was a territorial jurisdiction of the Crown of Castile since 1246 and until Javier de Burgos' provincial division of Spain in 1833. This was a "kingdom" in the second sense given by the : the Crown of Castile consisted of several such kingdoms. Jaén was one of the Four Kingdoms of Andalusia.

Like the other kingdoms within Spain, the Kingdom of Jaén was abolished by the 1833 territorial division of Spain.

See also
 Jaén, Spain
 :es:Anexo:Localidades del Reino de Jaén, a list of the localities that composed the Kingdom of Jaén, according to the Catastro of Ensenada (1750–54); this page is an appendix to the Spanish-language Wikipedia.

Notes

History of Andalusia
States and territories established in 1246
States and territories disestablished in 1833
1833 disestablishments in Spain